Ajeetpura is a town in the Hanumangarh district, Rajasthan state in India.

It was a historical town of Bikaner state. Now it is a Panchayat and Block headquarters. It is situated just 14 km far from Tehsil headquarters Bhadra in east direction (by air) and 24 km far by road via Amarpura. It is 148 km far from district. headquarters Hanumangarh in south-east direction.

Before 1994, Ajeetpura was totally a "Barani Bhoomi" area. In 1994, it joined with canal irrigation by Raslana Branch of Rajiv Gandhi Sidhmukh – Nohar Nahar Pariyojana. Raslana Branch crosses very near of Ajeetpura. It should be called "Lifeline of Ajeetpura". Because of it, Ajeetpura is an emerging market of this area. Last 10 years are so dry in the region, but this canal gave life to the people of the area.

Name
The name Ajeetpura was adopted in the memory of "Ajeet Giriji Maharaj", prior to this, it was known as Lahuwala and it was a residential town of The Rangharas. This village has been inhibited for more than a thousand years now. Historical mentions include this village being a seat for local zamindars before being taken over by the state of Bikaner.

Geography
It is situated in a semi-desert region in Rajasthan which is one of the most driest states of the country. There are a number of huge sand-hills here, called Tibba. About 56% area of total farming land is under desert. Trees are less here, comparing with the forests of southern Rajasthan.

History
Ajeetpura is a historical town of Rathore. first panchayat raj sarpanch of ajeetpura is SHRI KHAMAN CHAND CHHIMPA.  It was under the control of Bikaner state of Rajputana. There is also a heritage Fort called "GAD".

Heritage
Shiv Mandir, Ajeetpura is the most valuable heritage site in the town. It is a "Samadhi Sthal" of Baba Jhulewale Maharaj. It is the only tourist spot in the town, well known for its visitors from Kamaliya, who are called Kamaliyans. Other temples in the town include the Baba Ramdev Temple, Hanuman Temple, Shani Dev temple etc. There are two historical ponds in Ajeetpura, called "Dhaab". These are situated at the center of the town. These are known as the prior famous destinations of villagers for discussing any social matter.

Economy
Only 40% population of the town is dependent on farming and agriculture. About 60% population is dependent on secondary, and other occupations. About 900 – 1000 persons of the town are living in Gulf countries. Some of the employees are businessmen in the town and other are working out of Rajasthan, in other states like Assam, West Bengal, Bihar, Maharashtra, Gujarat, Punjab, Delhi etc. In this village many govt employees but mostly belong to late.khaman chand  chhimpa's family.
There is a small market in the town about 200 shops and one bank.

Ajeetpura's agriculture is often depend on rain but about 60% area of total farming area is about irrigated. Raslana Branch is the main canal of the area. It is a part of "'Rajiv Gandhi Sidhmukh – Nohar Nahar Pariyojana"'. Ajeetpura's farming area is divided into these following areas (local names) – Taal, Tibba, Mandpara, Jole, Pole, Dabala, Bharda, Meenawali etc.

In "Rabi" Chana is the most important product. Other crops of "Rabi" are Mustard, Wheat, Jau etc. And in "Kharif" Bajra is the major product.

Health and education
Seth Sahadev Lal Bansal Govt. Hospital, Ajeetpura is the main hospital in the town. It is the hub of about a dozen of sub-health centers. There are 4–5 private clinics are also in action.
There are 2–3 private school & six government schools.

Sports and recreation
Cricket is a popular sport with many cricket clubs in the town comprising the young talent; and three cricket grounds. Kabaddi is also a popular sport.

References

Cities and towns in Hanumangarh district